The Jade Pendant  is a 2017 American Western film directed by Leong Po-Chih and starring Godfrey Gao as Tom Wong, Clara Lee as Peony, following a tragic love story leading to the largest mass lynching in American history, of 19 Chinese immigrants in Los Angeles' Chinatown, in 1871.

Cast gallery

Plot
A tragic love story Follows the journey of a young girl and lead character in the film Peony (Clara Lee), who, fleeing an arranged marriage in China, is tricked into signing a contract to work as a "flower girl" in America, with her friend Lily (Nina Lu). Her determination and martial arts skills, aid her refusal to succumb to the world of prostitution, then she meets Tom (Godfrey Gao), an American Born Chinese cook whose father Mr. Wong, (Russell Wong) works on the Transcontinental Railroad. Despite the gender role reversal of Peony and Tom, the relationship thrives to marriage and a child. Throughout the film, Peony is wearing a circular disk green jade pendant, which was a gift from her grandmother to bring her luck and protection. Not all is blissful though, as Hong Kong Triad boss Yu Hing (Tzi Ma) seeks to extend his power into America, is fixated on obtaining Peony for his own needs. 
This film tells the tale of the first great Chinese migration to the United States, was released on the anniversary of the largest mass lynching in American history, of 19 Chinese immigrants in Los Angeles' Chinatown, in 1871 and was Filmed in Utah.

Cast
 Godfrey Gao as Tom Wong (湯姆・黃)
 Clara Lee as Peony / Ying Ying Leung Wong (牡丹 / 黃粱瑩瑩)
 Brian Yang as Sam (三姆)
 Tsai Chin as Madame Pong (龐太太)
 Russell Wong as Wong Lim (黃廉)
 Chen Tang as Joe Lee (李喬)
 Jamie Harris as Robert Thompson
 Nina Wu as Lily (莉莉)
 Sue Wong as Po Ping (王太太)
 Edward Zo as Mei Song (宋眉)
 Christine Ko as May (梅)
 Song Hanz as Rough Looking Man
 Raymond Ma as Dr. Tong (董大夫)
 Mark Boone Junior as Captain Wynne
 Tzi Ma as Yu Hing (余興)

Reception
The bigger Hollywood studios initially rejected the idea of a western with a cast of predominantly Asian descent, which would only be acceptable in a kung-fu movie. however, independent producer Thomas Leong liked the story and in 2015 agreed to the project. The Jade Pendant took the honour of receiving the "Golden Angel" Award for "the best film by an Independent Producer" at the 2017 Chinese American Film Festival in Los Angeles, California.

References

External links
 
 

2017 films
American Western (genre) films
Films set in the 1870s
Films set in Los Angeles
Triad films
2010s American films
2010s Hong Kong films